= A Coruña City Hall =

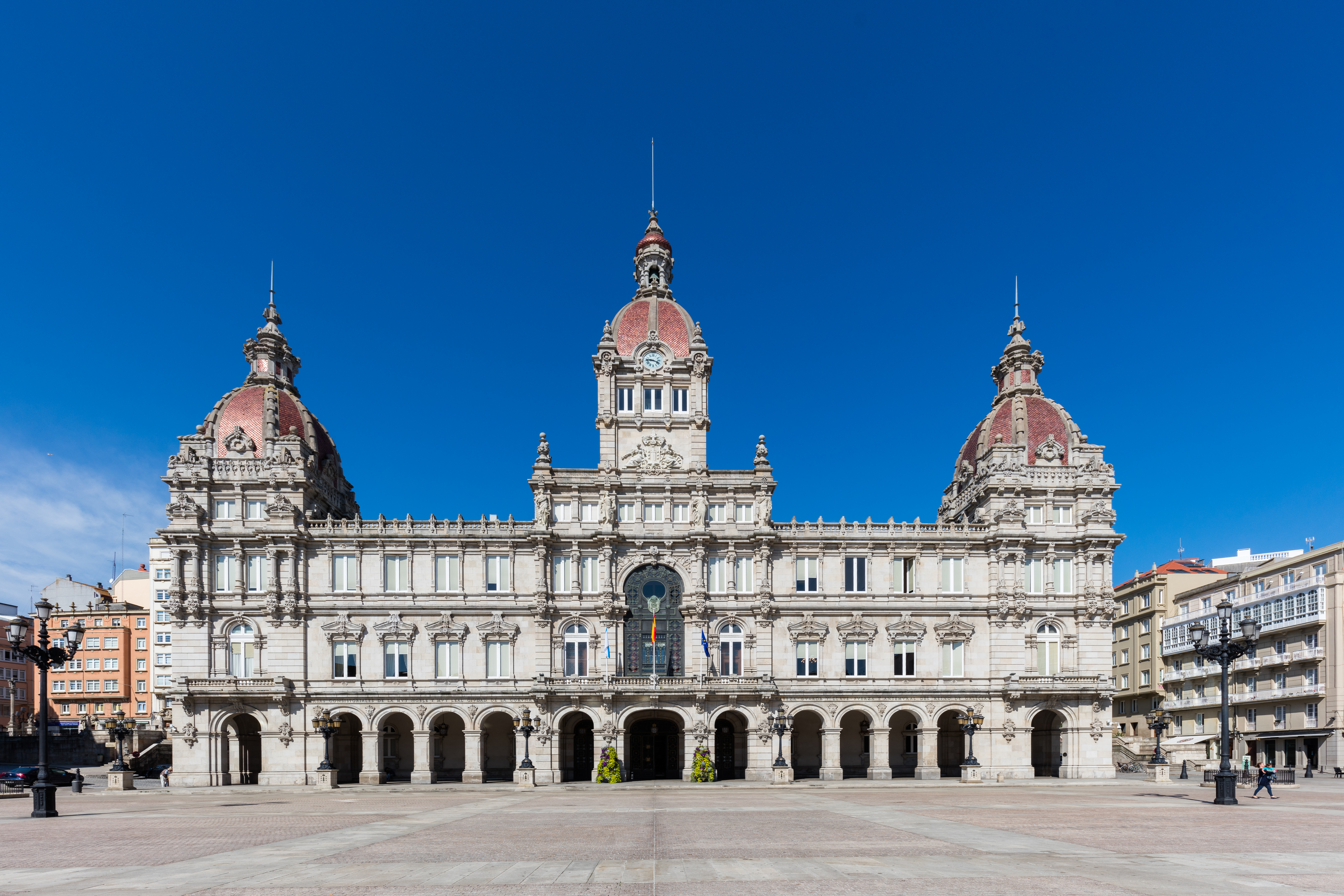
- A Coruña City Hall in 2015
- Click on the map for a fullscreen view

General information
- Location: A Coruña, Spain
- Coordinates: 43°22′16.78″N 8°23′45.03″W

A Coruña City Hall (Spanish: Palacio Municipal de La Coruña) is a historic city hall located at A Coruña in Spain.

== History ==
The building was designed in the early twentieth century by the municipal architect Pedro Mariño as the new headquarters of the city administration, in response to A Coruña's urban expansion and the need for a more representative civic building. Construction began in 1908 and was completed in 1912.

== Description ==
The building is a notable example of monumental Eclectic architecture in Galicia. Its stone façade, composed with strict symmetry, features an arcaded ground floor, regularly spaced openings, and three towers crowned by domes.
